Pleasantville High School may refer to:

Pleasantville High School (New Jersey)
Pleasantville High School (New York)